José González (born 13 August 1948) is a Mexican former sports shooter. He competed in two events at the 1968 Summer Olympics.

References

1948 births
Living people
Mexican male sport shooters
Olympic shooters of Mexico
Shooters at the 1968 Summer Olympics
Sportspeople from Mexico City